Si Lewen (8 November 1918, Lubin, Poland – 25 July 2016) was a Polish-American painter and member of the Ritchie Boys, a unit of the United States Army during World War II.

Lewen was born in 1918 into a Polish-Jewish family, who moved to Berlin in 1920. He received drawing lessons from Max Adron, a pupil of Paul Klee and Klaus Richter.

After Adolf Hitler came to power in 1933, Lewen and his older brother emigrated to France to prepare for the departure of the entire family to Palestine. In 1935, the family unexpectedly received visas to the United States. There, in New York City, Lewen attended an art school. He volunteered for the United States Army in 1942 and, because of his knowledge of German, became a member of the Ritchie Boys. On reaching Buchenwald Concentration Camp, he had a breakdown. What he saw inspired his later artwork about the war.

Art Spiegelman, author of Maus, published Lewen's Parade: An Artist's Odyssey in 2016, an "expanded "director's cut" version of images Lewen had created from 1950 and published in 1957 under the title Parade.

References

American painters
American people of Polish-Jewish descent
Ritchie Boys
1918 births
2016 deaths